The Popular Movement is a royalist and traditionalist rural-focused political party in Morocco. It is a member of Liberal International. The party has a history of cooperating with two other parties with a liberal orientation, the National Rally of Independents and the Constitutional Union, since 1993.

History
The Popular Movement was founded in 1957 by the Berber tribal chief Mahjoubi Aherdane with help from Abdelkrim al-Khatib who founded later a splinter party (Mouvement populaire démocratique et constitutionnel) that became the Justice and Development Party. It was initially a rural party with conservative and tribal orientation, that unconditionally supported the monarchy and aimed at countering nationalist Istiqlal Party. Although the party has been dominated by Berber speakers, it has not developed a distinct Berber agenda.

The present party results from a 25 March 2006 merger between the main party which had kept the original name and two splinter parties, the National Popular Movement (Mouvement National Populaire) and the Democratic Union (Union démocratique).

The party is a full member of Liberal International, which it joined at the latter's Dakar Congress in 2003.

In the parliamentary election held on 27 September 2002, the party won 27 out of the total 325 seats. It improved its standing in the parliamentary election held on 7 September 2007, winning 41 out of 325 seats.

The party won 32 out of 325 seats in the parliamentary election held in November 2011, being the sixth party in the parliament.

Electoral results

Moroccan Parliament

Notes
 In 1963, the MP run under the FDIC.

References

External links
Popular Movement official site

1958 establishments in Morocco
Conservative liberal parties
Conservative parties in Africa
Liberal International
Liberal parties in Morocco
Monarchist parties
Political parties established in 1958
Political parties in Morocco